The Paratrek Angel 2-B is an American powered parachute that was designed and produced by Paratrek of Auburn, California. Now out of production, when it was available the aircraft was supplied as a kit for amateur construction.

Design and development
The aircraft was designed to comply with the US FAR 103 Ultralight Vehicles trainer exemption as well as the US  Experimental - Amateur-built aircraft rules. It features a  parachute-style wing, two-seats-in-tandem or side-by-side configuration, tricycle landing gear and a single  Rotax 503 engine in pusher configuration. The  Hirth 2706 engine was a factory option.

The aircraft carriage is built from a combination of bolted aluminium and 4130 steel tubing. In flight steering is accomplished via foot pedals that actuate the canopy brakes, creating roll and yaw. On the ground the aircraft has lever-controlled nosewheel steering. The main landing gear incorporates sprung steel rod suspension.

The manufacturer estimated the construction time from the supplied assembly kit as 20 hours.

Operational history
By 1998 the company reported that six kits had been sold and two aircraft were completed and flying.

In April 2015 one example was registered in the United States with the Federal Aviation Administration.

Specifications (Angel 2-B)

References

Angel
1990s United States sport aircraft
1990s United States ultralight aircraft
Single-engined pusher aircraft
Powered parachutes